is a 2016 Japanese drama-adventure film by Nobuhiro Yamashita. It star Odagiri Joe and Aoi Yu. The film is based on Sato Yasushi's novel of the same name, which touches on prevalent societal issues such as divorce and mental health.

Plot 
Yoshio Shiraiwa is divorced from his wife who denies him from visiting their only daughter. He returns to his hometown of Hakodate and enrolls at a vocational school specializing in carpentry while receiving unemployment payments. One day, he chances upon an unconventional woman, Tamura Satoshi, in an argument with her boyfriend at the roadside. She imitates the courtship ritual of an ostrich which drove off her boyfriend. However, Shiraiwa is amused by it. Satoshi notices him and they make eye contact. Shiraiwa proceeds to leave. At the vocational school, he meets Kazuhisa Daishima who is also training to be a carpenter. One day, Kazuhisa Daishima takes him to a cabaret club. Yoshio Shiraiwa meets Satoshi again, engaged in a dance. Satoshi Tamura and Yoshio Shiraiwa become close.

Cast
 Joe Odagiri – Shiraiwa Yoshio 		
 Yū Aoi – Tamura Satoshi
 Shota Matsuda – Daishima Kazuhisa
 Yukiya Kitamura – Hara Koichiro
 Shinnosuke Mitsushima – Mori Yoshito
 Takumi Matsuzawa – Shimada Akira
 Tsunekichi Suzuki – Katsumada Kenichi
 Yuka – Ogata Yoko

References

External links
(in Japanese) Official site

2016 films
2010s Japanese-language films
Films set in Hakodate
2010s Japanese films